A revetment in stream restoration, river engineering or coastal engineering is a facing of impact-resistant material (such as stone, concrete, sandbags, or wooden piles) applied to a bank or wall in order to absorb the energy of incoming water and protect it from erosion.  River or coastal revetments are usually built to preserve the existing uses of the shoreline and to protect the slope.  

In military engineering it is a structure formed to secure an area from artillery, bombing, or stored explosives.

Freshwater revetments

Many revetments are used to line the banks of freshwater rivers, lakes, and man-made reservoirs, especially to prevent damage during periods of floods or heavy seasonal rains (see riprap).  Many materials may be used: wooden piles, loose-piled boulders or concrete shapes, or more solid banks.

Concrete revetments are the most common type of infrastructure used to control the Mississippi River.

Revetments as coastal defence

Revetments are used as a low-cost solution for coastal erosion defense in areas where crashing waves may otherwise deplete the coastline. 

Wooden revetments are made of planks laid against wooden frames so that they disrupt the force of the water. Although once popular, the use of wooden revetments has largely been replaced by modern concrete-based defense structures such as tetrapods. In the 1730s, wooden revetments protecting dikes in the Netherlands were phased out due to the spread of shipworm infestations.

Dynamic revetments use gravel or cobble-sized rocks to mimic a natural cobble beach for the purpose of reducing wave energy and stopping or slowing coastal erosion.
Unlike solid structures, dynamic revetments are designed to allow wave action to rearrange the stones into an equilibrium profile, disrupting wave action and dissipating wave energy as the cobbles move. This can reduce the wave reflection which often contributes to beach scouring.

Tetrapods

In coastal engineering, a tetrapod is a four-legged concrete structure used as armour unit on breakwaters. The tetrapod's shape is designed to dissipate the force of incoming waves by allowing water to flow around rather than against it, and to reduce displacement by allowing a random distribution of tetrapods to mutually interlock.

Fortifications

According to the U.S. National Park Service, and referring mostly to their employment in the American Civil War, a revetment is defined as a "retaining wall constructed to support the interior slope of a parapet. Made of logs, wood planks, fence rails, fascines, gabions, hurdles, sods, or stones, the revetment provided additional protection from enemy fire, and, most importantly, kept the interior slope nearly vertical. Stone revetments commonly survive. A few log revetments have been preserved due to high resin pine or cypress and porous sandy soils. After an entrenchment was abandoned, many log or rail revetments were scavenged for other uses, causing the interior slope to slump more quickly.  An interior slope will appear more vertical if the parapet eroded with the revetment still in place."

See also

References

External links

Fortifications
Pisa Revetment
Gabion Revetment

River and levee management
EPA - River Bend Project
Levee and Revetment Routine Maintenance
US DOT - Design of Riprap Revetment

Architectural elements
Coastal construction
Coastal engineering
Riparian zone
Environmental engineering
Ecological restoration
Limnology
Fortification (architectural elements)
Rivers